In public transport, Route 4 may refer to:

Route 4 (MTA Maryland), a bus route in the suburbs of Baltimore, Maryland
Barcelona Metro line 4
NWFB Route 4, a bus route in Hong Kong
London Buses route 4
Line 4 (Madrid Metro)
Line 4 Yellow (Montreal Metro)
4 (New York City Subway service), a subway line in New York City
Shanghai Metro Line 4

4